Iowa State Cyclones Cross Country represents Iowa State University (ISU) and competes in the Big 12 Conference of NCAA Division I. The team is coached by Martin Smith, he is currently in his 4th year at Iowa State. Originally, the men's and women's teams were considered separate; but beginning in the 2007 season the two teams were combined and are now operated as one single sport at the university. The Cyclones host their home meets at the Cross Country Course located on Iowa State's campus.

History

Men's team
The Iowa State men's cross country team made their first appearance as a team at the National Cross country meet in 1952. Between 1952 and 1987, Iowa State produced ten different individual All-Americans, many of them receiving the honors more than once.

In both 1987 and 1988, the men's team won the Big Eight Conference titles. In 1989, the team led by John Nuttall and Jonah Koech won their third consecutive Big Eight Conference championship and continued to the national meet with high hopes. At the NCAA Division 1 National Meet, Nuttall captured the individual crown, followed in second by his teammate Koech. The 1989 Iowa State Cyclone team won their first national championship with the second best team score in the previous 25 years.

For the next two years, Iowa State was the runner-up at the national meet. In 1994, the team, led by Ian Robinson, was once again Big Eight Conference Champions and was expected to contend for the national title. Although the meet was held on the home course of the defending champions, Arkansas, Iowa State captured the national title for the first time since 1989.

Martin Smith was hired in 2013 to replace Corey Ihmels as the new Director of Track & Field / Cross Country.  Martin has 35 years of collegiate coaching experience with 5 national championships, 25 conference championships, and nearly 300 All-Americans under his guidance.  Martin was hired from Oklahoma, where he led the men's cross country team to their highest finish ever at the 2012 NCAA XC National Championships.  Prior to Oklahoma, Smith coached at Oregon where he coached 65 All-Americans.  From 1983 - 1998, Smith coached at Wisconsin, where he led the men's cross country team to national championships in 1985 and 1988.  Smith coached at Virginia from 1980 - 1983, where he led the women to three national championships (indoor track in 1981 and cross country in 1981 and 1982).

Women's team

Iowa State first formed a collegiate women's cross country team in 1975.  Organizing a competitive team out of the gate, they won the 1975 Team AIAW Championship.  The team was led by Peg Neppel-Darrah, who won the 1975 Individual AIAW Championship as well.  They would go on to win the 1976, 1977, and 1978 title going on an early streak of dominance.  Iowa State would then win the 1981 title off the back of Dorthe Rasmussen's individual 1981 title.

The team was rocked by tragedy when the team plane crashed on the way back from finishing as runner-up at the 1985 NCAA Championships.  The university owned plane crashed over Des Moines due to suspected ice accumulation on the wings.  Those aboard were Burton Watkins of Ames, pilot of the airplane; Ron Renko, Head Coach of the ISU women's track and cross country teams; Stephanie Streit, student trainer for the Athletic Department; and cross country team members Susan Baxter, Julie Rose, and Sheryl Maahs.

After the set-backs the team didn't return to dominance until the mid-2000s under the wings of Lisa Koll.  While at Iowa State Lisa was a three time all-American and she would go on to compete in the 2012 Olympics.  Koll's individual success was followed shortly by Betsy Saina's, culminating in her winning an NCAA championship in 2012.  She too would go on to compete in the olympics, placing 5th at the 2016 games.

The current women's cross country coach is Andrea Grove-McDonough, she is in her fifth year.

Championships

Men's team championships

Women's team championships

Men's individual NCAA championships

Men's Individual conference champions

Women's individual national championships

Women's Individual conference champions

Record by year

Men's record by year
background: #FDC82F"|5-0

Division I Men's Cross Country Championships Records Book

Women's record by year

Division I Women's Cross Country Championships Records Book

The Association for Intercollegiate Athletics for Women was established in 1971 to govern collegiate women's athletics and to administer national championships.  Cross country was one of twelve women's sports added to the NCAA championship program for the 1981–82 school year, as the NCAA engaged in battle with the AIAW for sole governance of women's collegiate sports.  The AIAW continued to conduct its established championship program in the same twelve (including cross country) sports; however, after a year of dual women's championships, the NCAA conquered the AIAW and usurped its authority and membership.  Iowa State's 1975, 1976, 1977, 1978, and 1981 women's cross country championships were AIAW championships.

All-Americans

Men All-Americans

Iowa State Men's cross country has had 40 All-Americans since 1975 as well as two NCAA champions in John Nuttall, Jonah Koech in 1989 and 1990 and Edwin Kurgat in 2019 respectively.

Women All-Americans

Iowa State Women's cross country has had 36 All-Americans since 1975 as well as three national champions in Peg Neppel-Darrah, Dorthe Rasmussen, and Betsy Saina in 1975, 1981, and 2012 respectively.

ISU Cross Country Course

Iowa State is one of only a handful of institutions in the country to have its own fully dedicated cross country course located on its campus. The convenience of the course's location provides Iowa State University's distance runners a significant training advantage.

The athletic department dedicated the Cross Country Course in October 1995 as the first course in the nation designed exclusively for competitive cross country racing. The University showcased the course to a national audience by hosting the 1995 NCAA Division I Cross Country Championships. Since that time the course also served as the site of the 2000 NCAA Championships, the 2008 Big 12 Championships and the 2013 NCAA Midwest Cross Country Regional.

The athletics program recently invested nearly $1 million in course improvements including irrigating the entire course and creating a permanent finish line structure with two large grass berms that provide spectators incredible views of the finish area. The irrigation system allows the department's staff to maintain the running surface at a championship level throughout the season.

See also
Iowa State Cyclones track and field

References

 
Iowa State
Cross Country
1859 establishments in Iowa
Sports clubs established in 1859